List of the published work of Dana Goodyear, American journalist and poet.

Non-fiction
 
 
 
 
 
 
 
 
 
 
 
 
 
  The Salton Sea.

Poetry
Collections
 
 
List of poems

Notes

Bibliographies by writer
Bibliographies of American writers